Churchill and Sarsden are civil parishes in West Oxfordshire with a common parish council, about  southwest of Chipping Norton.

The joint body was formed in 2012 by merging the formerly separate parish councils of Churchill and Sarsden.

See also
 Churchill and Sarsden Heritage Centre

References

West Oxfordshire District